The women's 50 metre butterfly S6 event at the 2016 Paralympic Games took place on 9 September 2016, at the Olympic Aquatics Stadium in Rio de Janeiro. Two heats were held. The swimmers with the eight fastest times advanced to the final.

Heats

Heat 1 
10:00 9 September 2016:

Heat 2 
10:03 9 September 2016:

Final 
18:18 9 September 2016:

References

Swimming at the 2016 Summer Paralympics